Daria Timoshenko (born 1 August 1980) is a Russian-Azerbaijani former competitive figure skater. She is the 1999 World Junior champion for Russia. Timoshenko represented Russia until 2000 and then began competing for Azerbaijan. When her coach, Igor Rusakov, died of cancer in July 2003, she was then coached by Marina Selitskaia.

Timoshenko married Igor Lukanin in 2000. They have since divorced.

Programs

Results 
GP: Grand Prix; JGP: Junior Grand Prix

References

External links
 

Living people
1980 births
Figure skaters from Moscow
Russian female single skaters
Azerbaijani female single skaters
Russian emigrants to Azerbaijan
Naturalized citizens of Azerbaijan
World Junior Figure Skating Championships medalists
Universiade medalists in figure skating
Universiade bronze medalists for Russia
Competitors at the 1999 Winter Universiade